Forfar United Junior Football Club are a Scottish football club based in Forfar, Angus. The current club was formed in August 2020 following the amalgamation of the Forfar amateur team Lowson United and Forfar Albion (themselves formed in 1974 following the amalgamation of two existing local sides, Forfar Celtic (est. 1891) and Forfar East End (est. 1881)). 
After one season playing as Forfar East End Celtic, the name Albion was adopted in 1975. The club play at Guthrie Park and the team colours are maroon.

Up until the end of the 2005–06 season, they played in Tayside Division One of the Scottish Junior Football Association's Eastern Region.

The SJFA completed its restructuring of Junior football in the east of Scotland prior to the 2006–07 season, and Forfar Albion were placed in the twelve-team East Region, North Division. They finished ninth, 12th and 12th in seasons 2006–07, 2007–08 and 2008–09 respectively, but showed encouraging signs of improvement during the 2009–10 season.

Since May 2016, the team are under the management of Dave Thomson assisted by Tam McCabe and Mike Gellatly.

First-team squad

 (On loan from Downfield)

 (On loan from Dundee North End)

 (On loan from Dundee North End}

 (C)
 (On loan from Dundee North End)

 (On loan from Montrose)

 (On loan from Montrose)

References

External links
Forfar Albion website
Facebook
Twitter
Scottish Football Historical Archive

Football clubs in Scotland
Scottish Junior Football Association clubs
Association football clubs established in 1974
Football clubs in Angus, Scotland
1974 establishments in Scotland
Forfar